Colpocleisis is a procedure involving closure of the vagina.

It is used to treat vaginal prolapse.

In older women who are no longer sexually active a simple procedure for reducing prolapse is a partial colpocleisis. The procedure was described by 'Le Fort' and involves the removal of strip of anterior and posterior vaginal wall, with closure of the margins of the anterior and posterior wall to each other.  This procedure may be performed whether or not the uterus and cervix are present. When it is completed, a small vaginal canal exists on either side of the septum, produced by the suturing of the lateral margins of the excision.

See also
 Vaginectomy
 Vaginal atresia

Notes

References

Gynecological surgery
Female genital modification